Jessie Ulibarri is an American politician from Commerce City, Colorado. A Democrat, Ulibarri served four years in the Colorado Senate representing District 21 in Adams County. Ulibarri worked on the 2013 bill to allow Colorado same-sex couples to form civil unions.

Biography 
Ulibarri graduated from the University of Colorado, and became the first person in his family to receive a bachelor's degree. In 2013, Ulibarri completed Harvard University's John F. Kennedy School of Government program for Senior Executives in State and Local Government as a David Bohnett LGBTQ Victory Institute Leadership Fellow. His employment history includes working as a policy fellow with the office of Congressman Luis Gutierrez (D-Illinois), as Public Policy Director with the ACLU of Colorado, and as Senior Managing Associate for JVA Consulting.

Ulibarri was elected to the senate in 2012, beating Republican Francine Bigelow 64%-36%. His candidacy was endorsed by the Colorado Conservation Voters and the Gay & Lesbian Victory Fund. He did not run for re-election in 2016. Ulibarri is currently the Director of the State Innovation Exchange.

He now lives in Pittsburgh, Pennsylvania, with his partner, Louis. They have two children.

References

External links
 Jessie Ulibarri campaign website 
 Interview with West.Energy Media
 

Democratic Party Colorado state senators
LGBT Hispanic and Latino American people
Gay politicians
LGBT state legislators in Colorado
Living people
Hispanic and Latino American state legislators in Colorado
People from Commerce City, Colorado
21st-century American politicians
Year of birth missing (living people)